Katie Bickerstaffe is the co-CEO of Marks & Spencer, working alongside the CEO Stuart Machin.

In March 2022, it was announced that Machin and Bickerstaffe would succeed Steve Rowe as the leaders of M&S. On 25 May 2022 Machin became CEO, while Bickerstaffe became co-CEO.

References

Living people
British retail chief executives
British businesspeople in retailing
Marks & Spencer people
Year of birth missing (living people)